St. Albert was a federal electoral district in Alberta, Canada, that was represented in the House of Commons of Canada from 1988 to 2004. It contained Edmonton's western and northwestern suburbs, including the city of St. Albert.

Demographics

Geography 
This was a rural riding in Alberta.

History 
It was created in 1987 from Pembina and Yellowhead ridings.

It was abolished in 2003 and transferred mostly into Edmonton—St. Albert and Edmonton—Spruce Grove. Smaller parts were transferred into Westlock—St. Paul and Yellowhead ridings.

Members of Parliament

This riding elected the following Members of Parliament:
 1988–1993: Walter van de Walle – Progressive Conservative
 1993–2003: John G. Williams – Reform (1993–2000), Canadian Alliance (2000–2003), Conservative (2003–2004)

Election results 

^ Canadian Alliance change is from Reform.

^ Change is from redistributed results

See also 
 List of Canadian federal electoral districts
 Past Canadian electoral districts

References

External links 
 Library of Parliament Riding Profile
 Expenditures – 2000
 Expenditures – 1997

Former federal electoral districts of Alberta
Politics of St. Albert, Alberta